HNLMS De Zeven Provinciën was a  of the Royal Netherlands Navy. Laid down in 1939, construction was interrupted by World War II and the ship was only commissioned in 1953 with the identification number C802. She served until 1976 when she was purchased by Peru and renamed Aguirre. With the Peruvian Navy she served until 1999 and was scrapped in 2000.

Design
De Zeven Provinciën was armed with eight  guns in double turrets, 8 × 57 mm and 8 × 40 mm machine guns. The rear turrets were replaced in 1962 with a RIM-2 Terrier SAM system. She had a crew of 957.

During her service with the Peruvian Navy she was converted to a helicopter cruiser. To do this the remaining turrets at the back of the ship were removed to make space for a hangar and a flight deck big enough to support 4 helicopters.

History
Construction started in 1939 as Kijkduin, but was interrupted by World War II. She was renamed Eendracht in 1940 and De Ruyter in 1945. Her sister ship was launched in 1944 as De Zeven Provinciën, but the ships swapped to their final names in 1950. She was completed in 1953 and served the Royal Netherlands Navy from 1950 to 1977. She was sold to Peru in August 1976 and was renamed  on 24 February 1978.

Notes

References

 
 

De Zeven Provinciën-class cruisers
Ships built in Rotterdam
1941 ships
Cold War cruisers of the Netherlands
Naval ships of the Netherlands captured by Germany during World War II
Maritime incidents in 1958